Westminster Reference Library is a reference library in St Martin's Street, London, in the City of Westminster, part of the Westminster Libraries network.

History
The library was opened by W. Foxley Norris, dean of Westminster, on 8 October 1928 to replace the former library of the parish of St Martin in the Fields. The Leicester Fields chapel, built by the Huguenots in 1693, was once located on the site. Isaac Newton lived on a house on the site from 1710 to 1727, and later the house was occupied by the novelist Fanny Burney. The cellars of the house are part of the current building. The library was designed by the architect A. N. Prentice for Westminster City Council, and built by Walden & Company of Reading. It was modified in the 1950s and 1980s.

Collections
In addition to a general reference collection, the library has specialist fine art and performing arts, business and law collections. 

Since 2021 the library has also been home to the Westminster Music Library collection, which was formerly based at Victoria Library. Westminster Music Library is one of the largest public music libraries in the UK, holding a wide range of sheet music, scores, and books about music.

The library also loans telescopes.

Events and exhibitions
Outside of library opening hours the library has hosted many events and concerts including Telemachus, Sea Power, Mr Hudson and The Library, Polar Bear, Harry Keyworth, Chisara Agor, Piney Gir and The Real Tuesday Weld.

The library also has art exhibition spaces.

References

External links 

https://www.westminster.gov.uk/library-opening-hours-and-contact-details

Libraries in the City of Westminster
Grade II listed buildings in the City of Westminster

Public libraries in London